Santiago Danani La Fuente (born 12 December 1995) is an Argentine professional volleyball player. He is a member of the Argentina national team and a bronze medallist at the Olympic Games Tokyo 2020. At the professional club level, he plays for Aluron CMC Warta Zawiercie.

Honours

Clubs
 National championships
 2021/2022  German SuperCup, with Berlin Recycling Volleys
 2021/2022  German Championship, with Berlin Recycling Volleys

Youth national team
 2015  FIVB U21 World Championship
 2016  U23 Pan American Cup
 2016  CSV U23 South American Championship
 2017  FIVB U23 World Championship

Individual awards
 2015: FIVB U21 World Championship – Best Libero
 2016: Pan American Cup – Best Digger
 2016: Pan American Cup – Best Libero
 2016: Pan American Cup – Best Receiver
 2016: CSV U23 South American Championship – Best Libero
 2019: CSV South American Championship – Best Libero
 2021: CSV South American Championship – Best Libero

References

External links

 
 Player profile at LegaVolley.it 
 Player profile at PlusLiga.pl 
 Player profile at Volleybox.net
 
 

1995 births
Living people
Volleyball players from Buenos Aires
Argentine men's volleyball players
Olympic volleyball players of Argentina
Volleyball players at the 2020 Summer Olympics
Medalists at the 2020 Summer Olympics
Olympic medalists in volleyball
Olympic bronze medalists for Argentina
Argentine expatriate sportspeople in Italy
Expatriate volleyball players in Italy
Argentine expatriate sportspeople in Germany
Expatriate volleyball players in Germany
Argentine expatriate sportspeople in Poland
Expatriate volleyball players in Poland
Warta Zawiercie players
Liberos